"Teflon Don" was a nickname for American mobster John Gotti (1940 - 2002).

Teflon Don may also refer to:

 Vito Rizzuto (1946–2013), Canadian mafia leader known as "Montreal's Teflon Don"
 Rick Ross (born 1976), American rap producer whose original rap name was Teflon Don
 Teflon Don (album), Ross's 2010 album
 Donald Trump (born 1946), former US President and businessman who is often referred to as “The Teflon Don” in the media due to his many legal dealings and in reference to Gotti, as well as a play on his forename.